Leo Gregory (born 22 November 1978, Haverfordwest Pembrokeshire)  film, television, voice-over artist and pantomime actor. Best known for starring as Bovver in Green Street (2005).

Acting career
Gregory has appeared in films such as the BAFTA winning "When I Was 12", BAFTA and Michael Powell award-winning "Out of Control", Green Street, the Stephen Woolley directed Stoned, BAFTA winning "The Mark of Cain", "Wild Bill", and "Northmen". Television wise Gregory has appeared in the likes of "Mrs Biggs" for ITV, "The Musketeers" for BBC "Strike Back" for HBO/Cinemax and "Foyle's War" for ITV.

Filmography
Avengement (2019)
Plebs (2019)
Queen of Diamonds (2019)
London Kills (2018)
Once Upon a Time in London (2019)
The Team (2015 Danish/German/Belgian TV Series) (2015)
Need for Speed (2015) (Video game) ... Travis
Strike Back: Legacy (2015) ... Mason.. Ten Episodes.
The Musketeers (2015) ... Marmion.. episode 2.6 "Through a Glass Darkly".
Northmen (2014)... Jorund
  Foyle's War (2015 TV Series) ... Damian White
The Hooligan Factory (2014) ... Slasher
Top Dog (2014) ... Billy Evans
Wild Bill (2011) (Film) ... T
All Things to All Men (2013) ... Dixon
The Sweeney (2012)
"Sweet Nothing" (2012) (Music video) Calvin Harris feat. Florence Welch
One in the Chamber - Bobby Suverov (2012)
Payback Season (2012)
Mrs Biggs (2012) (Television) ... Eric Flower
Silent Witness (2012) (Television) ... Daniel Kessler
Above Suspicion: Silent Scream (2012) (Television) ... Lester James
Hamilton: In the Interest of the Nation (2012) ... Miller, Spectragon (Swedish Movie)
Nothing (2011)
Bali Brothers (2009) (in production) ... Eddie James
Men Don't Lie (2009) (pre-production) ... Brett
The Big I Am (2009) ... Skinner
Goal III: Taking on the World (2009) ... Charlie Braithwaite
Cass (2008) ... Freeman
Daylight Robbery (2008) ... Matty
Act of Grace (2008) ... Dezzie
Reverb (2007)
The Mark of Cain (2007) ... Lance Corporal Quealey
Cracker (2006) (TV) ... Wallet Thief
Perfect Creature (2006) ... Brother Edgar
Tristan + Isolde (2006) ... Simon
Stoned (2005) ... Brian Jones
Green Street (2005) ... Bovver (Bovril)
Suzie Gold (2004) ... Darren
Octane (2003) ... Joyrider
Menace (2002) (TV) ... Dennis Naylor
Out of Control (2002) (TV) ... Sam
EastEnders ... Mikey (1 episode, 2002)
The Jury (2002) TV mini-series ... Ally Maher
Fallen Dreams (2001) ... Rob
As If ... Toby Jarvis (1 episode, 2001)
When I Was 12 (2001) (TV) ... Paul
Aberdeen (2000) ... Young Man #1
Nature Boy (2000) TV mini-series ... Funfair Attendant (unknown episodes)
McCallum ... Paul (1 episode, 1997)
Samson and Delilah (1996) (TV) ... Jehiel a 14 anni
The Upper Hand ... Henry (1 episode, 1992)
Jewels (1992) (TV) ... Julian (age 15)

References

External links

Independent Talent: Leo Gregory

GSE

1978 births
Living people
English male film actors
English male television actors
People educated at Christ's Hospital